Ron River is a river in Quảng Bình Province in the North Central Coast region of Vietnam.

Rivers of Quảng Bình province
Rivers of Vietnam